Modern High School  is a school run by the Progressive Education Society based in Pune. The school is located in Shivajinagar area of  Pune. The society runs a college, elementary school and separate girls high school in Shivajinagar. The society also runs a school in  Nigdi, a suburb of Pune.It was founded in 1934 by Shankarao Kanitkar, who was also founder of the Nigdi branch of the  High School is a public, co-educational, Marathi- and English-language school.The school, which is recognised by the Government of Maharashtra, prepares its pupils for the Secondary School Certificate Examination (SSC - Std. 10 and HSC - Std.12). It has a junior college named Modern Junior College, at Nigdi.

See also 
List of schools in Pune

References 

Schools in Pune
1934 establishments in India
Educational institutions established in 1934
Schools in Colonial India